The Cottbuser Ostsee (Cottbus Eastern Lake) is an artificial lake under development on the grounds of the former open-pit lignite mine :de:Tagebau Cottbus Nord near Cottbus, Brandenburg, Germany.

Dimensions
However, this lake is reduced to a "rump" of  surface area in winter.

History
The last coal was mined in December 2015 and subsequently work began on converting the mine into a lake.
Flooding started in 2019 but had to be interrupted several times due to low water levels in the nearby Spree River. The lake is to become part of the Lusatian Lake District, a chain of artificial lakes mostly the result of open-pit lignite mining.

Name
The name - besides referring to the location of the lake to the East of central Cottbus -  can be interpreted as a pun on the German name for the Baltic Sea, which is called "Ostsee" in German, the two words only being distinguished by their grammatical gender: "See" meaning "sea" in German is grammatically female, whereas "See" meaning "lake" in German is grammatically male.

References 

Buildings and structures in Spree-Neiße
Artificial lakes of Germany